The Independent Wrestling Association Mid-South King of the Deathmatch is an annual professional wrestling tournament running since 1997 in which a number of wrestlers compete in various deathmatches, in (for the most part) a single-elimination tournament which is similar to World Wrestling Entertainment's King of the Ring tournament.  These tournaments include the typical weapons used in hardcore wrestling such as barbed wire, nails, thumbtacks, fire, and light tubes, and are known for their large amount of blood loss.

Notable entrants in the King of the Deathmatch tournaments have included Ian Rotten, Axl Rotten, Necro Butcher, Mad Man Pondo, Chris Hero, Balls Mahoney, Nick Mondo, and Mickie Knuckles.  Many of the cards have also included non-tournament matches featuring top indy wrestlers such as Nigel McGuinness, Colt Cabana, CM Punk, Tracy Smothers, Homicide, Jerry Lynn, Jimmy Jacobs, Alex Shelley, Sonjay Dutt, B. J. Whitmer, Matt Sydal, Delirious, Arik Cannon, Ray Gordy, Low Ki, Daizee Haze and MsChif.

In 2006, IWA Mid-South introduced the concept of The Royal Weekend of Death, featuring the King of the Deathmatch tournament, as well as two new tournaments, the Queen of the Deathmatch and the Double Death Tag Team Tournaments. The 2006 & 2007 tournaments for Queen and Double Death happened in November on back to back nights, while the 2008 Queen of the Deathmatches took place on the afternoon of night 2 of King of the Deathmatches, with Double Death taking part on October 17 and 18. Notable participants of the Queen of the Deathmatch tournament include Mickie Knuckles, Lufisto, Annie Social, and Mike Levy.

IWA Mid-South King of the Deathmatch Tournament

King of the Deathmatch 1997
October 21, 1997 saw the first annual IWA Mid-South King of the Deathmatch Tournament, held at the National Guard Armory in New Albany, Indiana.

Competitors

Round one
 Ian Rotten def. Cash Flo - Thumbtack Bat & Barbed Wire Boards Match
 Rollin' Hard def. Bull Pain - Thumbtack Bat & Barbed Wire Boards Match
 Balls Mahoney def. War Machine #1 - Barbed Wire Board & Barbed Wire Bat Match
 Axl Rotten def. War Machine #2 - Four Corners of Pain Match
 Mad Man Pondo def. Tower of Doom - Four Corners of Pain Match
 Doug Gilbert def. Ox Harley - Barbed Wire Boards & Barbed Wire Bat Match

Semi-finals
 Ian Rotten def. Rollin' Hard - Barbed Wire & Glass Spidernet Double Hell Match
 Axl Rotten def. Balls Mahoney - FORFEIT
 Doug Gilbert def. Mad Man Pondo - Barbed Wire & Glass Spidernet Double Hell Match

Final
 Ian Rotten def. Axl Rotten† - No Rope Barbed Wire, Electrified Light Tubes, Lights Out Death Match
†Doug Gilbert refused to fight in the final

King of the Deathmatch 2000
After a 3-year break, the tournament returned in 2000, this time running over two nights (October 20 and 21) at the House of Hardcore in Charlestown, Indiana. Non-tournament matches included Puppet def. T.O. in a Midget Thumbtack Match, and Brain Damage def. Toby Klein

Competitors

Round one
 2 Tuff Tony def. Suicide Kid - Thumbtack Bat Thumbtack Death Match
 Alister Fear def. Todd Morton - Thumbtack Bat Thumbtack Death Match
 Manslaughter def. Richard X - Fans Bring the Weapons Match
 Axl Rotten def. Uncle Honkey - Barbed Wire Bat and Barbed Wire Boards Match
 Mark Wolf def. Ian Rotten - Barbed Wire Bat and Barbed Wire Boards Match
 Corporal Robinson def. Delilah Starr - 4 Corners of Pain Match
 Rollin' Hard def. Cash Flo - 4 Corners of Pain Match

Quarter-finals
 Rollin' Hard def. Mark Wolf - Cactus Death Match
 Manslaughter def. Axl Rotten - Barbed Wire Match
 Corporal Robinson def. Cash Flo - Lumberjack Lighttubes Match
 Alister Fear def. 2 Tuff Tony - Fans Bring the Weapons Match

Semi-finals
 Rollin' Hard def. Alister Fear - No Rope Barbed Wire & Caribbean Spider Web Death Match
 Corporal Robinson def. Manslaughter - No Rope Barbed Wire & Caribbean Spider Web Death Match

Finals
 Rollin' Hard def. Corporal Robinson - Flaming Casket Death Match

King of the Deathmatch 2001
King of the Deathmatch 2001 was held over 2 nights (June 1 & 2) at the House of Hardcore in Charlestown, Indiana.

Competitors

Round one
 Suicide Kid  def. Richard X - Barbed Wire Bat Match
 Mark Wolf def. Uncle Honkey - Barbed Wire Boards
 Rollin Hard def. Deranged - Barbed Wire Boards
 Trent Baker def. Tower of Doom - Thumbtack Match
 Corporal Robinson def. Chris Hero - Thumbtack Match
 Hido def. Bull Pain† - Barbed Wire Bat Match
 Axl Rotten def. Shank Dorsey - Barbed Wire Salt Death Match
 Mean Mitch Page def. Paul E. Smooth - Barbed Wire Salt Match
 2 Tuff Tony def. Mr. Insanity - 4 Corners of Pain Match
 Necro Butcher def. American Kickboxer - 4 Corners of Pain Match
 Ian Rotten def. Peter B. Beautiful - Fans Bring the Weapons Match
 Sick Nick Mondo def. Cash Flo - Fans Bring the Weapons Match
†Hido injured his arm in this match and was unable to compete in the next round. Corporal Robinson received a bye as a result.

Quarter-finals
 Suicide Kid def. Mark Wolf - Barbed Wire Tables Match
 Rollin' Hard def. Trent Baker - Staple Gun Match
 "Mean" Mitch Page def. Axl Rotten - Tapei Death Match
 Necro Butcher def. 2 Tuff Tony - Staple Gun Match
 Ian Rotten def. Sick Nick Mondo - Light Tube Tables & Fans Bring The Weapons Match

Semi-finals
 Rollin' Hard def. Suicide Kid - Barbed Wire Taipei Salt Death Match
 "Mean" Mitch Page def. Corporal Robinson - Balcony Death Match
 Ian Rotten def. Necro Butcher - Flaming Tables Death Match

Finals
 Ian Rotten def. Rollin Hard and "Mean" Mitch Page - House Of Pain Three Way Dance (200 light tubes covering the ropes and 3 log cabins of glass outside the ring)

King of the Deathmatch 2002
King of the Deathmatch 2002 was held over 2 nights (July 12 & 13) at the IWA Arena in Clarksville, Indiana. Non-tournament matches included Chris Hero def. Colt Cabana (Night One) and Chris Hero def. Colt Cabana and Tracy Smothers (Night Two)

Competitors

Round one
 Nate Webb def. Chuck E. Smooth - Staple Gun Match
 Mad Man Pondo def. Adam Gooch - Barbed Wire Bat Match
 Ian Rotten def. Hugh Rogue - Fans Bring The Weapons Death Match
 Corporal Robinson def. Alister Fear - Lighttubes Lumberjack Match
 Mitch Page def. Dave Donovan - Fans Bring The Weapons Match
 Necro Butcher def. Mark Wolf - Barbed Wire Boards Match
 Dysfunction def. Rollin' Hard - Texas Barbed Wire Salt Match
 2 Tuff Tony def. Cash Flo - Thumbtack Bat & Barbed Wire Boards Match

Quarter-finals
 Dysfunction def. Corporal Robinson - Taipei Death Match
 2 Tuff Tony def. Ian Rotten - Electrified Lighttubes Match
 Necro Butcher def. Mitch Page - Fans Bring The Weapons Death Match
 Nate Webb def. Mad Man Pondo - Barbed Wire Tables & Lighttubes Tables Death Match

Semi-finals
 Nate Webb def. Dysfunction - Barbed Wire Canvas Match
 Necro Butcher def. 2 Tuff Tony - Log Cabins of Glass Match

Finals
 Necro Butcher def. Nate Webb - No Ropes Barbed Wire, Electrified Lightbulbs, Fluorescent Lightbulb, House of Pain Caribbean Spiderweb, Barbed Wire Board & Pool of Lobsters Match

King of the Deathmatch 2003
King of the Deathmatch 2003 was held over 2 nights (August 1 & 2) at the IWA Arena in Clarksville, Indiana. Non-tournament matches included:
Night One -  Jerry Lynn def. Jimmy Jacobs, Mickie Knuckles' debut match (and victory) against Hailey Hatred, Chris Hero def. Homicide (IWA-MS World title match)
Night Two - Sonjay Dutt & Adam Flash def. Alex Shelley & Jimmy Jacobs and Nate Webb & M-Dogg 20, Bull Pain vs Jim Fannin (no contest), Nigel McGuinness def. Colt Cabana, Homicide def. B. J. Whitmer, Danny Daniels def. Chris Hero (Texas Death Match for the IWA-MS World title), The Messiah def. Corporal Robinson (CZW World Heavyweight Title)

Competitors

Round one
 Mad Man Pondo def. Nate Webb - High Impact Tables Match
 Mitch Page def. Rollin Hard - Taipei Death Match
 Balls Mahoney def. Horace the Psychopath - Barbed Wire Boards & Barbed Wire Bat Match
 J.C. Bailey def. 2 Tuff Tony - Electrified Light Tubes & Barbed Wire Tables Match
 Axl Rotten def. Corporal Robinson - Fans Bring the Weapons Match
 Nick Gage def. Dysfunction - 4 Corners of Pain Match
 Necro Butcher def. Toby Klein - Fans Bring the Weapons Match
 Ian Rotten def. The Messiah - East Coast Thumbtacks Death Match

Quarter-finals
 Mad Man Pondo def. Axl Rotten - Light Tube Tables Match
 J.C. Bailey def. Necro Butcher - Light Tube Coffin Match
 Nick Gage def. Mitch Page - Barbed Wire Canvas & Light Tube Ropes Match
 Ian Rotten def. Balls Mahoney - Fans Bring the Weapons Match

Semi-finals
 J.C. Bailey def. Ian Rotten - Fans Bring the Weapons Match
 Mad Man Pondo def. Nick Gage - Bed of Nails & Caribbean Spider Web Match

Finals
 Mad Man Pondo def. J.C. Bailey - Barbed Wire Ropes, House of Horrors Steel Cage Match

King of the Deathmatch 2004
King of the Deathmatch 2004 was held over 2 nights (June 25 & 26) at the Oolitic Community Center in Oolitic, Indiana. Non-tournament matches included:
Night One -  Danny Daniels & B. J. Whitmer def. Matt Sydal & Delirious, CM Punk def. Ray Gordy, Chris Hero def. Arik Cannon
Night Two - MsChif def. Mickie Knuckles and Daizee Haze, Delirious def. Matt Sydal (IWA-MS Light Heavyweight title match), Chris Hero & Homicide def. Ray Gordy & B. J. Whitmer

Competitors

Round one
 Low Life Louie def. Homicide - Barbed Wire Boards Match
 Ryan Boz def. Smokey C - Barbed Wire Boards Match
 Manslaughter def. Trik Davis - Thumbtack Death Match
 Tank def. Deranged - Four Corners of Pain Match
 Ian Rotten def. Nate Webb - Fans Bring the Weapons Death Match
 Corporal Robinson def. Dysfunction - 2 out of 3 Log Cabins of Glass Match
 Mad Man Pondo def. J.C. Bailey - Fans Bring the Weapons Death Match
 Toby Klein def. Necro Butcher - Fans Bring the Weapons Death Match

Quarter-finals
 Low Life Louie def. Ryan Boz - Unlucky 13 Staple Gun Match
 Corporal Robinson def. Ian Rotten - Barbed Wire Ropes Lighttubes & Pool Of Rubbing Alcohol
 Tank def. Deranger - Barbed Wire Ropes & Fans Bring the Weapons Death Match
 Toby Klein def. J.C. Bailey† - Electrified Light Tubes Match
†Deranged replaced Manslaughter and J.C Bailey replaced Mad Man Pondo

Semi-finals
 Corporal Robinson def. Low Life Louie - Fans Bring the Weapons Match
 Toby Klein def. Tank - Fans Bring the Weapons Match

Finals
 Corporal Robinson def. Toby Klein - House of Pain Glass Death Match

King of the Deathmatch 2005
King of the Deathmatch 2005 was held over 2 nights (November 18 & 19) at the Capital Sports Arena in Plainfield, Indiana.  Non-tournament matches included:
Night One -  Jimmy Jacobs def. C.J. Otis (IWA-MS World title), Hailey Hatred def. Mickle Knuckles (IWA-MS Women's title), Matt Sydal & Delirious def. The Iron Saints
Night Two - Ian Rotten & Mickie Knuckles & Delirious & C.J. Otis def. Sal & Vito & Brandon Thomaselli & Josh Abercrombie, Danny Havoc def. Hellaware Assassin and Brandon Prophet in a Fans Bring the Weapons Match

Competitors

Round one
 J.C. Bailey & Nate Webb def. Josh Abercrombie - Three Way Tables & Thumbtacks Steel Cage
 Mitch Page & Tank def. Brain Damage - Three Way Unlucky 7 Staple Gun
 Bull Pain & Deranged def. Hillbilly Jed - Three Way Barbed Wire Ropes & Barbed Wire Boards Match
 Corporal Robinson & Necro Butcher def. Brandon Prophet - Three Way Barbed Wire Ropes, Fans Bring the Weapons Match
 Toby Klein & Dysfunction def. Danny Havoc - Three Way Barbed Wire Ropes, Fans Bring the Weapons Match
 Mad Man Pondo & Nick Gage def. The Hellaware Assassin - Three Way Taipei Death Gloves, & Fans Bring the Weapons Match
The first round matches held on day one were all three-way dances with two competitors from each match advancing to the quarter finals.

Quarter-finals
 J.C. Bailey def. Dysfunction - Barbed Wire Ropes & Barbed Wire Canvas Match
 Mitch Page def. Nate Webb - Barbed Wire Ropes & Light Tube Tables Match
 Deranged def. Mad Man Pondo - Barbed Wire Ropes, 2/3 Light Tube Log Cabins Match
 Toby Klein def. Corporal Robinson - Barbed Wire Ropes & Light Tube Ropes Match
 Bull Pain def. Nick Gage - Barbed Wire Ropes, Light Tube Ropes & 4 Corners of Pain Match
 Necro Butcher def. Tank - Barbed Wire Ropes, Light Tube Ropes & Fans Bring the Weapons Match

Semi-finals
 J.C. Bailey def. Mitch Page - Barbed Wire Ropes, Light Tube Ropes & Fans Bring the Weapons Match
 Toby Klein def. Deranged - Barbed Wire Ropes, Light Tube Ropes & Fans Bring the Weapons Match
 Necro Butcher def. Bull Pain - Barbed Wire Ropes, Light Tube Ropes & Fans Bring the Weapons Match

Finals
 Toby Klein def. J.C. Bailey & Necro Butcher - Three Way 200 Light Tubes Match

King of the Deathmatch 2006
King of the Deathmatch 2006 was held over 2 nights (June 2 & 3) at the Capital Sports Arena in Plainfield, Indiana. Non-tournament matches included:
Night One - Darrin Corbin def. Arik Cannon (IWA-MS World title)
Night Two - Trik Davis def. Arik Cannon and Darrin Corbin (IWA-MS World title), The Children of Pain (Jacob Ladder & Darin Childs) def. Insane Lane & Juggulator in a Flaming Tables Match

Competitors

†Prior to the tournament, three Bunkhouse Battle Royals were held at IWA Mid-South events, with the winners being awarded a bye in the first round. Rollin' Hard won a bye at April Bloodshowers 2006 on April 21, JC Bailey won a bye at Any Given Saturday on April 22, and Hardcore Craig won a bye at Spring Heat 2006 on May 19

Round one
 Drake Younger def. Dustin Lee - Light Tube Corners Steel Cage Match
 Flash Flanagan def. Billy Black - Thumbtack Death Match
 Dysfunction def. Dinn T. Moore - 4 Corners of Pain Match
 Deranged def. Spidar Boodrow - Barbed Wire Ropes & Barbed Wire Boards Match
 Mitch Page def. J-Boy - Barbed Wire Ropes, Tabasco, Salt & Lemon Juice Match
 Toby Klein def. Jacob Ladder - Taipei Death Match
 Brain Damage def. Darin Childs - Unlucky 13 Staple Gun Match
 Ian Rotten def. Brandon Prophet & Insane Lane - Three Way Dance Fans Bring The Weapons Match
 Corporal Robinson def. Juggulator - Fans Bring The Weapons Match
 Mad Man Pondo def. WHACKS - Fans Bring The Weapons Match
 Tank vs. Bull Pain ended in a draw - Barbed Wire Dog Collar Match

Quarter-finals
 Dysfunction def. Flash Flannigan - Barbed Wire Tables & Ladder Steel Cage Match
 Corporal Robinson def. Mad Man Pondo - Electrified Light Tubes Match
 J.C. Bailey def. Drake Younger - Bare-Foot Thumbtack Death Match
 Mitch Page def. Rollin' Hard - Light Tube Ropes & Pool of Leeches Match
 Ian Rotten def. Mickie Knuckles - Fans Bring The Weapons Match
 Toby Klein def. Brandon Prophet† - 2/3 Light Tube Log Cabins Match
 Tank def. Bull Pain - Light Tube Lumberjack Match
 Brain Damage def. Deranged - Fans Bring The Weapons Match
†Brandon Prophet replaced Hardcore Craig

Semi-finals
 Dysfunction def. Ian Rotten - Barbed Wire Ropes & Pool of Rubbing Alcohol Match
 Mitch Page def. J.C. Bailey - Barbed Wire Ropes & Pool of Lobsters Match
 Brain Damage def. Tank - Barbed Wire Ropes, Fans Bring the Weapons Match
 Toby Klein def. Corporal Robinson - Barbed Wire Ropes, Fans Bring the Weapons Match

Finals
 Mitch Page def. Dysfunction, Brain Damage & Toby Klein - 200 Light Tube House of Pain Total Elimination Death Match

King of the Deathmatch 2007
King of the Deathmatch 2007 was held over 2 nights (June 22 & 23) at the Capital Sports Arena in Plainfield, Indiana. Non-tournament matches included:
Brandon Thomaselli def. Low Ki (IWA-MS Light-Heavyweight title), The Naptown Dragons def. Southern Rock in a Circle City Street Fight, Insane Lane & Danny Havoc def. Rollin Hard & Mitch Page and Fukimoto & Deranged in a three-way tag match (Mitch Page's retirement match)

Competitors

Round one
 Mickie Knuckles def. Tank - Barbed Wire Ropes & Barbed Wire Baseball Bats Match
 Necro Butcher def. Rollin' Hard - Taipei Death Match
 Mad Man Pondo def. Scotty Vortekz - Staple Gun, 4 Corners of Pain Match
 Drake Younger def. Kenji Fukimoto - Barbed Wire Ropes, Thumbtack Insanity Match†
 Dysfunction def. Danny Havoc - Tables, Ladder, Chairs & Light Tubes Barbed Wire Steel Cage Match
 Freakshow def. Mitch Page - Home Run Derby Death Match
 Brain Damage def. Insane Lane - Fans Bring The Weapons Match
 Corporal Robinson def. Deranged - Fans Bring The Weapons Match
†Drake Younger put the IWA Mid-South Deathmatch Championship up for this match, and retained

Quarter-finals
 Corporal Robinson def. Mad Man Pondo - Electrified Light Tubes Match
 Brain Damage def. Mickie Knuckles - Fans Bring The Weapons Match
 Dysfunction def. Drake Younger - Barbed Wire Boards & Barbed Wire Baseball Bat Match†
 Freakshow def. Necro Butcher - Fans Bring The Weapons Match
†Drake Younger put the IWA-MS Deathmatch title up for this match and lost, making Dysfunction the new champion

Semi-finals
 Corporal Robinson def. Dysfunction - London Bridge Death Match†
 Freakshow def. Brain Damage - Hot Coals & Lit Cigarettes Match
†Dysfunction put the IWA-MS Deathmatch title up for this match and lost, making Corporal Robinson the new champion

Finals
 Corporal Robinson def. Freakshow - No Rope Barbed Wire & 200 Light Tubes Death Match†
†Corporal Robinson put the IWA-MS Deathmatch title up for this match, and retained

King of the Deathmatch 2008
King of the Deathmatch 2008 took place over 2 nights (June 20 & 21) in the parking lot of Alley Cats Lanes bowling alley in Sellersburg, Indiana, and was an 18-man tournament.

Non-tournament matches on Night One included Sara Del Rey defeating Mickie Knuckles, Dingo defeating Chuck Taylor for the IWA-MS Heavyweight Title, and Jimmy Jacobs and Tyler Black defeating Egotistico Fantastico and "Mr. Insanity" Toby Klein.

Non-tournament matched on Night Two included Jason Hades defeating Bryan Skyline to retain the IWA Mid-South Light Heavyweight Championship, Dingo's first successful IWA-MS Heavyweight Title defence against Toby Klein, and a four-way match during which Tank defeated Corey Shaddix, WHACKS and Viper.

Competitors

Round one

The Round One matches were all three-way matches, with the first person pinned or submitting was eliminated from the tournament.

 Ian Bloody and Devon Moore def. Corey Shaddix - Fans Bring The Weapons Match
 CJ Otis and Darin Childs def. Drew Lucid - Electrified Light Tubes Match
 Danny Havoc and Nick Gage def. WHACKS - Light Tubes and Ladders Match
 Freakshow and Mad Man Pondo def. Viper - Light Tube Bundles Match
 Insane Lane and Deranged def. Tank - Fans Bring The Weapons Match
 Dustin Lee and Scotty Vortekz def. Drake Younger - Barbed Wire Madness Match

Quarter-finals
 Devon Moore def. Ian Bloody - Death From Above Match
 Insane Lane def. CJ Otis - 4 Corners of Pain Match
 Derangeddef. Darin Childs - Unlucky 13 Staple Gun Match
 Dustin Lee def. Mad Man Pondo - Fans Bring The Weapons Match
 Danny Havoc def. Scotty Vortekz - Barefoot Thumbtacks, Bottle Caps, and Broken Glass Match
 Nick Gage def. Freakshow - Taped Fist Texas Death Match

Semi-finals
 Danny Havoc def. Deranged and Insane Lane - Cinder Block Match
 Devon Moore def. Nick Gage and Dustin Lee - Pyramids of Pain Match

Final
 Devon Moore def. Danny Havoc - 200 Light Tube, No Rope Barbed-Wire Scaffold Match

King of the Deathmatch 2009
The Eleventh King of the Deathmatch tournament took place at the Hartman Recreation Center in Joliet, Illinois, over 2 nights: March 6, 2009 and March 7, 2009.

Competitors

Round one
 xOMGx def. Devon Moore - Barbed Wire Ladders, Barbed Wire Tables & Caribbean Spider Web Match
 Danny Havoc def Elkview Adam - Barefoot Shit You Don't Want To Step On Death Match (Mouse Trap Board & Christmas Ball Caps)
 Dysfunction def. Viper - Barbed Wire Canvas & Light Bulbs Match
 Mad Man Pondo def. Nate Webb - Bed of Nails and Anything With Nails On Them Match
 Corporal Robinson def. D. J. Hyde - Thumbtack Madness Match
 Masada def. Tank - Barbed Wire Boards, Barbed Wire Ladder & Taipei Death Match
 Thumbtack Jack def Nick Gage - Deep Six Death Match (No Rope Barbed Wire, Fish Hooks & Chains)
 Necro Butcher def. Bull Pain - No Rope Barbed Wire, Broken Glass Caribbean Spider Web Match

Semi-finals
 Dysfunction def. xOMGx - Home Run Derby Death Match
 Thumbtack Jack def. Mad Man Pondo - Fans Bring The Weapons Match
 Necro Butcher def. Danny Havoc - Home Improvement Death Match
 Masada def. Corp. Robinson - Light Tubes, Cinder Blocks with Glass & Hot Coals Match

Final
 Masada def. Necro Butcher, Thumbtack Jack, and Dysfunction - Fatal 4-Way Double Ring, No Ropes Barbed Wire, Gigantic Fans Bring The Weapons, 30 Minutes Anything Goes Iron Man Death Match

King of the Deathmatch 2010
The twelfth KOTDM was held over 2 nights: Friday, June 4, 2010, and Saturday, June 5, 2010, in Bellevue, Illinois, at the Bellevue Plaza.

In non-tournament action one night one, Johnathon Gresham defeated Drake Younger and Jimmy Jacobs in a 3-way dance and American Kickboxer stopped by on his bike ride from Ohio to California to raise concussion awareness.  In non-tournament action on night two, Markus Crane def. Simon Sezz; Tyler Black def. Johnathon Gresham and gains entry into TPI 2010; and the Hooligans and Matt Cage def. Necro Butcher, Michael Faith, and Chuey Martinez.

Confirmed Competitors

Round 1
 Devon Moore def. Mason Cutter - Thumbtack Kickpads and Gloves on a Pole Match
 Bull Pain def. Kyle Threat - Homerun Derby
 Mitch Page def. Simon Sezz - Homewrecker Death Match
 Balls Mahoney def. Michael Faith - Fan Brings The Weapons Match
 Neil Diamond Cutter def. Devin Cutter - 4 Corners of Pain Match
 Whacks def. Chuey Martinez - Loose Light Tubes Match
 Nick Gage def. Necro Butcher - Bar Room Brawl
 J.C. Bailey def. Ian Rotten - No Ropes Barb Wire Light Tubes Match

Quarter-finals
Neil Diamond Cutter def. Whacks - Log Cabin Light Tubes Match
J.C. Bailey def. Nick Gage - Barbwire Strap Match
Balls Mahoney def. Bull Pain - "You Swing Yours I'll Swing Mine" Match‡
Devon Moore def. Mitch Page - Fans Bring The Weapons Match

Semi-finals
Devon Moore def. Neil Diamond Cutter - Barbwire Dog Collar Match
J.C. Bailey def. Balls Mahoney - Texas Death Match

Finals
J.C. Bailey def. Devon Moore - No Ropes Barbwire, Electrified Light Tubes, and Pits of Hell Match

†Chuey Martinez wrestled with a broken leg.

‡Balls Mahoney's Chairs vs. Bull Pain's Bat Match

King of the Deathmatch 2011
The 13th KOTDM was held in Bellevue, Illinois, on Friday, September 16 to September 17 at the Bellevue Plaza.  In non-tournament action B. J. Whitmer def. Bucky Collins to claim the vacated Light Heavyweight Title on night 1.  On night 2, Bucky Collins defeated Markus Crane, Neil Cutter, Devin Cutter, and Joey Grunge beat Reed Bentley, Juicy Jimmy Feltcher, and Damian Payne in a 6 Man(Losers From Night 1) Tag Match, and B. J. Whitmer def. Masada.

Confirmed Competitors

Round 1
Pinkie Sanchez def. Juicy Jimmy Feltcher - Fans bring the Thumbtacks and Thumbtack Weapons Challenge Match
Freakshow def. Joey Grunge - Home Run Derby Match
Simon Sezz def. Damian Payne - Pop My Cherry Death Match
Mason Cutter def. Devin Cutter - Caribbean Spider Web Glass Death Match
Rory Mondo def. Reed Bentley - TLC 4 Corners of Pain Match
Devon Moore def. Markus Crane - Hardcore Aerial Assault Match
Matt Tremont def. Masada - Barbwire Board, Tai Pai, Sandpaper Kickpads Match
Drake Younger def. Neil Diamond Cutter - Fans Bring The Weapons Match

Round 2
Devon Moore def. Pinkie Sanchez - 4 Corners of Hell Match
Drake Younger def. Mason Cutter - World Series of Glass Match
Simon Sezz def. Rory Mondo - "Death Becomes Us" Match
Matt Tremont def. Freakshow - Fans Brings The Weapons Match

Finals
Drake Younger def Devon Moore, Simon Sezz and Matt Tremont - No Rope Barbed Wire, 250 Light Tubes, Tables and Ladder Match

King of the Deathmatch 2014
Was held June 28, 2014 as part of a doubleheader titled "Royal Day of Death" at the Rustic Frog in New Albany, Indiana.

Confirmed Competitors

Bull Bronson
Christian Skyfire
Corporal Robinson
Devon Moore
Freakshow
Jesse Fuckin' Amato
John Wayne Murdoch
Josh Crane
Matt Tremont
Mitch Page
Suicide Kid
Ron Mathis

Non-Tournament Match
B. J. Whitmer & Michael Elgin def. The Hooligans (Devin Cutter & Mason Cutter)

Round 1
Josh Crane def. Christian Skyfire - Barefoot BLT Match (Bulbs, Legos & Tacks)
Mitch Page def. Suicide Kid - Hot Coals, Panes of Glass Match
Ron Mathis def. Devon Moore - Barbed Wire Tables and Ladders Match
John Wayne Murdoch (w/ Jason Saint) def. Bull Bronson - Bed of Nails and Carpet Strips Match
Corporal Robinson def. Freakshow - Fans Bring the Weapons Match
Matt Tremont def. Jesse Fuckin' Amato - World Series of Glass, Best of 7 Log Cabin Match

Round 2
Josh Crane def. Mitch Page and Corporal Robinson - Broken Beer Bottles and Light Tubes Match
Matt Tremont def. Ron Mathis and John Wayne Murdoch - Fans Bring the Weapons, Spider Net Match

Finals
Matt Tremont def Josh Crane - Barbed Wire Rope, Panes of Glass, Light Tubes, Barbed Wire Board, Casket, and Fans Bring the Weapons Match

King of the Deathmatch 2015
Was held June 26 through 27, 2015 at the American Legion Post#335 in Clarksville, Indiana.

Confirmed Competitors

Round 1
 JD Horror def. Bryant Woods - Fans Bring The Weapons Match
 Devon Moore def. Reed Bentley - TLC X2 Match (Tables, Tacks, Ladders, Lighttubes, Chairs, Candles)
 Dale Patricks def. Adam Bueller - Barefoot Fishhooks, Syringes, Carpet Strips, and Tubes Match
 John Wayne Murdoch def. Corporal Robinson - Feel The Burn Match (Coals, Rubbing Alcohol, Lit Cigarettes, Tabasco Sauce)
 Nick Gage def. Markus Crane - Venus Fly Trap Match
 Matt Tremont def. TANK - Texas Bullrope, Barbed Wire Boards and Cactus Pits Match
 MASADA def. The Green Phantom - Caribbean Spider Web Match
 Sexxxy Eddy def. Insane Lane - Homerun Derby Death Match

Quarter finals
 John Wayne Murdoch def. Devon Moore - Circus Death Match
 Nick Gage def. Sexxxy Eddy - Unlucky 13 Staple Gun Match
 Masada def. Dale Patricks - Cinderblocks and Lighttubes Match
 Matt Tremont def. JD Horror - World Series of Glass Match

Semi-finals
 John Wayne Murdoch def. Nick Gage - Home Improvement Death Match
 Matt Tremont def. Masada - Fans Bring the Weapons Match

Final
 Matt Tremont def. John Wayne Murdoch - House of Horrors Death Match w/ Toby Klein as the Guest Referee

King of the Deathmatches 2016
Was held on August 6, 2016, at the Pride Bar in New Albany, Indiana.

Confirmed Competitors

Round 1
John Wayne Murdoch def. Jeff King, Deadly Dale, Conor Claxton - Fans Bring the Weapons Match
Dale Patricks def. Markus Crane, Josh Crane, Rickey Shane Page - Barbed Wire Boards, Pits of Gusset Plates, Pits of Alcohol Match
Matt Tremont def. Jeff Cannonball, Brad Cash, Bryant Woods - 100 Light Tubes Match
D. J. Hyde def.  Devon Moore, Reed Bentley, Joseph Schwartz - 4 Corners of Pain, Carpet Strips & Fish Hook Ropes Match

Semi-finals
Matt Tremont def. Dale Patricks - World Series of Glass Match
John Wayne Murdoch def. The Lariat God" D. J. Hyde - Home Run Derby Match

Finals
John Wayne Murdoch def. Matt Tremont - House of Horrors Match

King of the Deathmatches 2017
Was held on May 20, 2017, at the Flea Market in Memphis, Indiana.

Confirmed Competitors

Non-Tournament Matches
Marcus Everett def. Cole Radrick -  Singles Match
Jake Crist def. Eddie Kingston and Shane Mercer (w/ Jason Saint) - Three Way Match

Round 1
John Wayne Murdoch def. Ludark Shaitan and Nick Depp and Reed Bentley - Home Run Derby/Light Tube Fence Match 
Dale Patricks def. Aidan Blackhart and Eric Ryan and Markus Crane - Fans Bring the Weapons Match 
Devon Moore def. G-Raver and Jeff King and Mance Warner - Log Cabins of Glass & Four Corners of Pain Match 
Rickey Shane Page def. Brad Cash and Bryant Woods and Masada - Great American Barbecue Deathmatch

Semi-finals
John Wayne Murdoch def. Dale Patricks - Barefoot Carpet Strips, Gusset Plates and Thumbtacks Death Match
Rickey Shane Page def. Devon Moore - Kevin Hogan Box Of Death, Barbed Wire Boards, Taipei Match

Finals
Rickey Shane Page def. John Wayne Murdoch - House of Horrors Death Match

King of the Deathmatch 2018
Was held May 18 through 19, 2018 at the Flea Market in Memphis, Indiana. In non-tournament action Dale Patricks def. Bryant Woods and G-Raver in a 3-Way Match at night 2.

Confirmed Competitors

Round 1
 Devon Moore and John Wayne Murdoch def. Amazing Maria - Barbed Wire Bat, Barbed Wire Board and Loose Tubes Match†
 Conor Claxton and Rickey Shane Page def. Bryant Woods - Taipei Death 4 Corners Of Pain Match
 JC Rotten and Nick Gage def. Mike Roach - Home Run Derby Match
 Aeroboy and SHLAK def. Eric Ryan - Gusset Plate Chairs, Lightube Doors and Loose Tubes Match
 Neil Diamond Cutter and Miedo Xtremo def. Dale Patricks - Stairway To Hell (Barbed Wire Ladder, Pits of Coals and Pits of Tubes) Match
 Ciclope and Markus Crane def. G-Raver - Fans Bring The Weapons Match
†John Wayne Murdoch put the IWA-MS World Heavyweight title up for this Match, and retained.

Quarterfinals
 Ciclope def. Aeroboy and Miedo Xtremo - Gussett Plates Madness Match
 Rickey Shane Page and JC Rotten and Neil Diamond Cutter - Shopping Cart Death Match
 Nick Gage def. John Wayne Murdoch and SHLAK - Fans Bring The Weapons Match†
 Markus Crane def. Conor Claxton and Devon Moore - Lightubes and Cinder Blocks Death Match

†John Wayne Murdoch put the IWA-MS World Heavyweight title up for this match and lost, making Nick Gage the new champion.

‡All quarterfinals matches were Total Elimination.

Semi-finals
 Rickey Shane Page def. Markus Crane - World Series of Glass (Lightubes Edition) Match
 Nick Gage def. Ciclope - World Series of Glass (Mirrors Edition) Match†

†Nick Gage put the IWA-MS World Heavyweight title up for this match, and retained.

Final
 Nick Gage def. Ricke Shane Page - House of Horrors Death Match†

†Nick Gage put the IWA-MS World Heavyweight title up for this match, and retained.

King of the Deathmatch 2020
Was held July 31 through August 1, 2020 in  Connersville, Indiana.

Confirmed Competitors

Non-Tournament Matches
Night 1:
Jake Crist (/w JT Davidson) defeated Ace Perry(c) & Kevin Giza - IWA Mid-South Heavyweight Championship Match

Night 2:
Shane Mercer def. Gary Jay - Singles Match: 
Josh Crane def. Slade Porter - Singles Match 
Jake Crist(c) (/w JT Davidson) def. Lincoln Moseley - IWA Mid-South Heavyweight Championship 
Aaron Williams def. Chris Dickinson - No Holds Barred Match 
Tristen Ramsey def. Eddy Only, Casanova Valentine & BC Killer - Four Way Fans Bring The Weapons Match

Round 1
Rickey Shane Page def. JC Rotten - Barbed Wire Madness, Stairway To Hell Match
Dale Patricks def. Josh Crane - Barefoot Bad Landing Death Match
Jeff King def. Eddy Only - Desert Storm Taipei Death Match
Shlak def. Casanova Valentine - Fans Bring The Weapons Match
Aeroboy def. Tristen Ramsey  - Death From Above Match
Orin Veidt def. Jimmy Lloyd - World Series Of Electrified Lighttubes Match
Eric Ryan def. BC Killer - Glass Galore Texas Death Match
John Wayne Murdoch def. Shane Mercer - No Rope Barbed Wire, Caribbean Spider Web, Double Hell Death Match

Quarterfinals
Shlak def. Rickey Shane Page - Final Construction Death Match
John Wayne Murdoch def. Jimmy Lloyd - Medieval Death Match
Eric Ryan def. Jeff King - Panes of Glass Match
Dale Patricks def. Aeroboy - High Impact Tables Death Match

Semi-finals
Eric Ryan def. John Wayne Murdoch - Glass Castle Death Match
Shlak def. Dale Patricks - Carnival Death Match

Final
 Eric Ryan def. Shlak - Barbed Wire Cage, House of Horrors Match

King of the Deathmatch 2021
Was held on July 30 through July 31, 2021 at the Southside Turners in  Indianapolis, Indiana.

Confirmed Competitors

Round 1
Mance Warner def. Bobby Beverly - Barbed Wire Madness, Texas Bullrope Death Match
Bam Sullivan def. Rickey Shane Page - Everything Including The Kitchen Sink Death Match
SHLAK def. Insane Lane - World Series Of Glass Death Match
Logan James def. Rebecca Payne - Homerun Derby Death Match
Eric Ryan def. Shane Mercer - Four Corners of Pain Death Match
Neil Diamond Cutter def. Jake Crist - Taipei Double Hell Death Match
Atticus Cogar def. Dan O'Hare - Lighttube Bundles, Call Of The Wild Death Match
Otis Cogar def. Jeff Cannonball - You've Got Me Pins, Needles & Nails Death Match
Aeroboy def. Dale Patricks - Death From Above Match
John Wayne Murdoch def. Ian Rotten - Fans Bring The Weapons Death Match
Orin Veidt def. Casanova Valentine - In Through The Out Door Death Match
MASADA def. Kevin Giza - It's Electrified Death Match

Quarterfinals
MASADA def. Mance Warner and SHLAK - Chains & Panes Death Match
Aeroboy def. Bam Sullivan and Logan James - Wire Nets, Tubes & Panes Death Match
Orin Veidt def. John Wayne Murdoch and Otis Cogar - Dry Ice Open Box Fans Death Match
Eric Ryan def. Atticus Cogar and Neil Diamond Cutter - Glass Everywhere Death Match

Semi-finals
Orin Veidt def. Aeroboy - Pits of Glass And Cut Cans Death Match
Eric Ryan def. MASADA - Construction Death Match

Final
Eric Ryan def. Orin Veidt - House Of Horrors Death Match

King of the Deathmatch 2022
Will be held on August 19 through August 20, 2022 at the Summit Park District in  Summit, Illinois.

Confirmed Competitors

Round 1
??? vs. ??? - ??? Match

Quarterfinals
??? vs. ??? - ??? Match

Semi-finals
??? vs. ??? - ??? Match

Final
??? vs. ??? - ??? Match

IWA Mid-South Queen of the Deathmatch Tournament

Queen of the Deathmatch 2006
November 3, 2006 saw the first annual IWA Mid-South Queen of the Deathmatch Tournament, held at the Capital Sports Arena in Plainfield, Indiana.

Competitors

†Amy Lee was scheduled to fight LuFisto in the first round, who had pulled out due to a hand injury sustained fighting Necro Butcher in a Canadian Death Match tournament called Bloodstock put on by Stranglehold Wrestling. SeXXXy Eddy was brought in as a last minute replacement.

Quarter-finals
 Mickie Knuckles def. Ann Thraxxx - Unlucky 13 Staple Gun Death Match
 Rachel Putski def. Vanessa Kraven - Thumbtack Death Match
 SeXXXy Eddy def. Amy Lee - Four Corners of Pain Death Match
 Mayumi Ozaki def. Sumi Sakai - Barbed Wire Ropes & Barbed Wire Boards Death Match

Semi-finals
 Mickie Knuckles def. Rachel Putski - Taipei Death Match
 Mayumi Ozaki def. SeXXXy Eddy - 2 out of 3 Log Cabins of Glass Death Match

Final
 Mickie Knuckles def. Mayumi Ozaki - No Rope Barbed Wire, Electrified Light Tube Fans Bring The Weapons Steel Cage Death Match

Queen of the Deathmatch 2007
October 27, 2007 saw the second annual IWA Mid-South Queen of the Deathmatch Tournament, again held at the Capital Sports Arena in Plainfield, Indiana. This card also included a 2007 Revolution Strong Style Tournament Qualifying Match between CJ Otis and Deranged.

Competitors

Quarter-finals
 LuFisto def. B.B. Walls and Roxie Cotton - Barbed Wire Ropes & Thumbtack Death Match Three Way Dance
 Storm def. Mickie Knuckles and Misty Heat - Barbed Wire Ropes & Barbed Wire Baseball Bat Death Match Three Way Dance

Semi-finals
 Mickie Knuckles def. B.B. Walls - Barbed Wire Ropes & Deathmatch Bats (Loser's Bracket)
 Roxie Cotton def. Misty Heat - Barbed Wire Ropes & Barbed Wire Ladder Death Match (Loser's Bracket)
 LuFisto def. Storm - Barbed Wire Ropes & Four Corners of Pain Death Match (Winner's Bracket)
 Mickie Knuckles def. Roxie Cotton - Barbed Wire Ropes & Taipei Death Match (Loser's Bracket)

Final
 LuFisto def. Mickie Knuckles - No Rope Barbed Wire & Electrified Light Tubes Death Match

Queen of the Deathmatch 2008
June 21, 2008 saw the third annual IWA Mid-South Queen of the Deathmatch Tournament, held in the parking lot of Alley Cats Lanes bowling alley in Sellersburg, Indiana. Once again there were last minute changes to the competitors, leading to a 6-woman tournament, with the winner of the first round match between Mickie Knuckles and "Glasses" Jones being awarded a bye into the Final.

Competitors

Note: LuFisto had been announced as taking part, but has withdrawn due to flight schedule issues.
†Rachel Summerlyn wrestled in the 2006 QOTDM as Rachel Putski

Quarterfinals
 Rachel Summerlyn def. Annie Social - Thumbtack Death Match
 Mickie Knuckles def. "Glasses" Jones - Unlucky 13 Staple Gun Death Match
 Rebecca Payne def. Monique Mercy - Fetish Death Match

Semi-finals
 Mickie Knuckles def. "The White Lion" Mike Levy - Fans Bring The Weapons Match†
 Rebecca Payne def. Rachel Summerlyn - Barbed Wire Madness Match

Final
 Rebecca Payne def. Mickie Knuckles - Fans Bring the Weapons, Taipei Deathmatch

† Mike Levy came to the ring complaining that he had not been given a slot in either of the Deathmatch Tournaments, so Mickie agreed to wrestle him in the Semi Finals.  During the match Levy "no sold" Mickie's offence, leading to a legitimate beatdown from Ian Rotten, Devon Moore, John Calvin, Tank and others.

Queen of the Deathmatch 2014
Was held June 28, 2014 as part of a doubleheader titled "Royal Day of Death" at the Rustic Frog in New Albany, Indiana. In non-tournament action LuFisto beats Jordynne Grace(with Rodney Rush).

Competitors

Quarterfinals
 Heidi Lovelace def. Hudson Envy - Tacks, Ladders & Canes Death Match
 Randi West def. Mistress Burgundy - Glass Death Match
 Thunderkitty def. Jewells Malone - Barbed Wire Dog Collar & Cat O' Nine Tails On a Pole Death Match
 LuDark Shaitan def. Kiki Rose - Barefoot Four Corners of Pain Death Match

Semi-finals
 Randi West def. Thunderkitty - Bats With Shit On Them Death Match
 LuDark Shaitan def. Heidi Lovelace - Fans Bring the Weapons Death Match

Final
 Randi West def. LuDark Shaitan - Four Corners of Pain Death Match

Queen of the Deathmatch 2015
Was held June 27, 2015 as part of a doubleheader at the American Legion Post#335 in Clarksville, Indiana.

Competitors

Quarter-finals
 Sage Sin Supreme def. Thunderkitty - Tai Pei Death and Barbed Wire Boards Death Match
 Kathy Owens def. Sabrina Sixx- Four Corners of Pain Death Match
 Ludark Shaitan def. Mistress Burgandi- Tacks, Carpet Strips, Barb Wire Bundles and Light Tube Ropes Death Match

Semi-finals
 Kathy Owens def. Sage Sin Supreme - Fans Bring the Weapons Death Match
 Ludark Shaitan def. Randi West - Home Run Derby Match†

†Randi West received a bye to round 2 because her opponent Rebecca Payne no showed the show.

Final
 Ludark Shaitan def. Kathy Owens - Gusset Plates With Pools of Rubbing Alcohol Death Match

Queen of the Deathmatch 2021
Will be held November 6, 2021 at German Park in Indianapolis, Indiana.

Competitors

Quarter-finals
 Ludark Shaitan def. Gabby Gilbert - Deadlier Homes and Gardens Match
 Sage Sin def. Lilith Grimm - Trick or Teeth Death Match
 Kasey Kirk def. Sarahdox - Barefoot 4 Corners of Pain Match
 Rebecca Payne def. Amazing Maria - The Whole SHEbang Match

Semi-finals
 Ludark Shaitan def. Kasey Catal - Death Match
 Rebecca Payne def. Sage Sin - Death Match

Final
 Rebecca Payne def. Ludark Shaitan - Death Match

Queen of the Deathmatch 2022
Will be held on August 20, 2022, at the Summit Park District in Summit, Illinois.

Competitors

Quarter-finals
??? vs. ??? - ??? Match
??? vs. ??? - ??? Match
??? vs. ??? - ??? Match
??? vs. ??? - ??? Match

Semi-finals
??? vs. ??? - ??? Match
??? vs. ??? - ??? Match

Final
??? vs. ??? - House of Horrors Match

IWA Mid-South Double Death Tag Team Tournament

Double Death Tag Team Tournament 2006
November 4, 2006 saw the first annual IWA Mid-South Double Death Tag Team Tournament, held at the Capital Sports Arena in Plainfield, Indiana. This was the first tournament of its type to be held in the United States, where both members of a team have to be eliminated.  The card also included a non-tournament match in which SeXXXy Eddy & Jagged def. Mitch Ryder & Chuck Taylor.

Competitors

Quarter-finals
 Older & Younger def. Naptown Dragons - TLC & Lighttubes Steel Cage Match
 Tough Crazy Bastards def. Hugh Rogue & Chuey Martinez - Barbed Wire Boards & Bar Room Brawl
 Dysfunction & Corporal Robinson def. Insane Lane & Freakshow - Taipei Death & Shit That Hurts When You Get It In Your Cuts Match
 Mad Man Pondo & 2 Tuff Tony def. Children of Pain - Electrified Lighttubes Death Match

Semi-finals
 Tough Crazy Bastards def. Older & Younger - Fans Bring The Weapons Death Match
 Mad Man Pondo & 2 Tuff Tony def. Dysfunction and Corporal Robinson - Fans Bring The Weapons Death Match

Final
 Mad Man Pondo & 2 Tuff Tony def. The Tough Crazy Bastards - No Rope Barbed Wire, Cactus Caribbean Spider Webs Death Match

Double Death Tag Team Tournament 2007
The second Double Death Tournament took place on October 26, 2007, at the Capital Sports Arena in Plainfield, Indiana.

Competitors

Quarter-finals
 Vulgar Display of Power def. Freakshow and Prophet - Full Spool of Barbed Wire Death Match
 The Bloody Brothers def. Mickie Knuckles & Storm - Barbed Wire Ropes & Barbed Wire Boards Death Match
 Drake Younger & Corey Shaddix def. The Naptown Dragons - Barbed Wire Ropes & Deathmatch Bats Death Match
 Devon Moore & Joker def. C.J. Otis & xOMGx - Barbed Wire Ropes, Tables, Ladders & Chairs Death Match

Semi-finals
 The Bloody Brothers def. Joker & Devon Moore - Fans Bring The Weapons Death Match
 Vulgar Display of Power def. Drake Younger & Corey Shaddix - Fans Bring The Weapons Death Match

Final
 Vulgar Display of Power def. The Bloody Brothers - House of Horrors Cage Death Match

Double Death Tag Team Tournament 2008
October 18 and 19, 2008 saw the third annual IWA Mid-South Double Death Tag Team Tournament, held at the Hartman Recreation Center in Joliet, Illinois.

Announced Competitors

Round one
 Cereal Killers def. Joey Grunge & Mephisto - 4 Corners Of Pain Match
 The Bloody Brothers def. Stephen Saint & Donnie Peppercricket - Fans Bring The Weapons Match
 DUI def. Murder Inc. - Loose Light Tubes & Home Run Derby Death Match
 Beers & Tits def. Freakshow & Elkview Adam in an Unlucky 13 Staple Gun / Stairway To Hell Match
 Grits-N-Gravy def. Michigan Militia - barbedwire TLC Match
 Tracy Smothers & Corporal Robinson def. Chris Havius & Rob Tapp - German Dog Collar Death Match
 Dysfunction & Danny Havoc def. Kody Rice & Chase McCoy - Glass & Sandpaper Taipei Death Match
 Vulgar Display of Power def. Tough Crazy Bastards - Fans Bring The Weapons Match

Quarter-finals
 DUI def. Cereal Killers - Barbed Wire Corners & Light Tube Ropes Match
 The Bloody Brothers def. Grits-N-Gravy - Barbed Wire Madness Match
 Vulgar Display of Power def. Tracy Smothers & Corporal Robinson - Texas Death Match
 Dysfunction & Danny Havoc def. Beer & Tits - Fans Bring The Weapons Match

Semi-finals
 DUI def. The Bloody Brothers - 4 Corners Of Pain & Weapons Match
 Vulgar Display of Power def. Dysfunction & Danny Havoc - Fans Bring The Weapons Match

Final
 Vulgar Display of Power def. DUI - No Rope Barbed Wire, Caribbean Spiderweb & Light Tube & Barbed Wire Coffin Match

Double Death Tag Team Tournament 2021
The fourth Double Death Tournament was held on April 3, 2021, at the Axl Rotten Memorial Hall in Connersville, Indiana.

Competitors

Non-Tournament Matches
Vincent Nothing def. Pompano Joe

Quarter-finals
The Underdogs def. 44.OH 1 - Barbed Wire Madness Match
44.OH 2 def. The Hallowed - Fans Bring The Weapons Match
Young Dragons def. Neil Diamond Cutter & Herzog - Lightubes Ropes, Lightubes Bundles and 4 Corners of Pain Match
John Wayne Murdoch & Satu Jinn def. Bloody Brothers 2.0  - Taipei Death World Series of Glass Match

Semi-finals
John Wayne Murdoch & Satu Jinn def. The Underdogs - Up In Ya Death Match
44.OH 2 def. Young Dragons - Lightube Door Derby Match

Final
44.OH 2 def. John Wayne Murdoch & Satu Jinn - Caribbean Spider Web 200 Lightubes Death Match

Dutch Double Death Tag Team Tournament 2021
The fifth Double Death Tournament will take place on November 7, 2021, at the Turner's Hall in Indianapolis, Indiana. It will be the first Double Death with mixed tag teams.

Competitors

Quarter-finals
 John Wayne Murdoch & Sage Sin def. Brad Cash & Sara Dox - No Rope Barbed Wire, Japanese Buckles Match
 Insane Lane & Rebecca Payne def. Eric Ryan & Gabby Gilbert - No Rope Barbed Wire & Pallets Of Destruction Match
 The Kirks (Brandon Kirk & Kasey Kirk) def. JC Rotten & Amazing Maria - No Rope Barbed Wire, Lightbulbs and Lighttubes Fence Match
 Orin Veidt & Lilith Grimm def. Ludark Shaitan & Satu Jinn - No Rope Barbed Wire, Caribbean Spiderweb Match

Semi-finals
 The Kirks (Brandon Kirk & Kasey Kirk) def. John Wayne Murdoch & Sage Sin - Death Match
 Insane Lane & Rebecca Payne def. Lilith Grimm & Orin Veidt - Death Match

Final
 The Kirks (Brandon Kirk & Kasey Kirk) def. Insane Lane & Rebecca Payne - Death Match

IWA Mid-South Prince of the Deathmatch Tournament

Prince of the Death Matches 2010
It was held Friday, April 23, 2010, at the Bellevue Plaza in Bellevue, Illinois.
Competitors

Quarter-finals
 Markus Crane def. Dixieland Destroyer - Barbwire Madness Match
 Neil Diamond Cutter def. Jon Moxley - Curt Hennig Drunken Tai Pei Death Match
 Ron Mathis def. Brian Gott - Barbwire Canvas Texas Bullrope Match
 OMG def. Simon Sezz - Barefoot Thumbtacks and Light Tubes Match

Semi-finals
 Neil Diamond Cutter def. Kyle Threat - Unlucky 13 Fish Hooks Match
 Markus Crane def. Ron Mathis in  a Caribbean Spider Web Death Match

Finals
Neil Diamond Cutter def. Markus Crane - Ultimate Hardcore X No Rope Barbed Wire Match

Prince of the Death Matches 2015
It was held March 15, 2015
Competitors

Quarter-finals
JC Rotten def. Kerry Awful - Barbed Wire Madness Match 
The American Viking def. Kathy Owens - Barbed Wire Madness Match 
Dale Patricks def. Adam Bueller - Barbed Wire Madness Match 
 Mikey McFinnegan def. Nick Doepp - Barbed Wire Madness Match

Semi-finals
Dale Patricks def. JC Rotten - Barbed Wire Madness Match 
Mikey McFinnegan def. The American Viking - Fans Bring The Weapons Match

Finals
Dale Patricks def. Mikey McFinnegan -  No Ropes Barbed Wire, Light Tube, Gussets Match

Prince of the Death Matches 2016
Was held June 19, 2016 at the Pride Bar +Lounge in New Albany, Indiana.
Competitors

Quarter-finals
Jeff King def. Amazing Maria - Home, Lawn and Garden Death Match
Joseph Schwartz def. JJ Garrett - Thumbtack Madness and Carpet Strips
Zodiak def. Aidan Blackhart - Barbed Wire Boards And Bats Match
Deadly Dale def. Shad O' Satu - Tapei Four Corners Of Pain Match

Semi-finals
Deadly Dale def. Zodiak - Cinder Blocks & Gusset Plates Match
Joseph Schwartz def. Jeff King - Home Run Derby Match

Finals
Joseph Schwartz def. Deadly Dale - Fans Bring The Weapons Match

Prince of the Death Matches 2017
Was held on for March 11, 2017 at the Memphis Flea Market in Memphis, Indiana. The winner of 2017 Prince of the Deathmatches gets entry into the 2017 King of the Deathmatches on May 20, 2017.

Competitors

Round one
Thumbtack Madness Death Match: Nick Depp def. Amazing Maria
Log Cabins Of Glass Death Match: Derek Direction def. Aidan Blackheart
Barbed Wire Bats and Barbed Wire Boards Death Match: Mitch Ryder def. Mad Mex
Tai Pei Death and Pits Of Rubbing Alcohol Death Match: Mance Warner def. Eric Ryan

Round two
Home Run Derby Death Match: Nick Depp def. Derek Direction
28 Years Of Bad Luck Match: Mance Warner def. Mitch Ryder

Round three
Fans Bring The Weapons Match: Nick Depp def.  Mance Warner

Prince of the Death Matches 2018
Was held on March 10, 2018, at the Memphis Flea Market in Memphis, Indiana. Field expanded to 12 Competitors.

Competitors

Quarter-finals
JC Rotten def. Cash Borden & Alister Wilde - Electrified Light Bulbs, Light Tubed & Light Tube Canvas 3 Way Match 
Tripp Cassidy def. Kody Rice & Orin Verdt - Barbed Wire Boards & Bats 4 Corners of Pain 3 Way Match
Justin Storm def. Gary Galaxy & Mike Roach - Homerun Derby 3 Way Match
Amazing Maria def. Eric Wayne & Marko Stunt - Thumbtack Madness 3 Way Match

Semi-finals
Amazing Maria def. Justin Storm - Drunken Taipei Match: 
JC Rotten def. Tripp Cassidy - Fans Bring the Weapons Match

Finals
Amazing Maria def. JC Rotten - World Series of Glass House of Pain Match

Prince of the Death Matches 2020
Was held September 25, 2020 at the Axl Rotten Memorial Hall in Connersville, Indiana.

Competitors

Non Tournament: 
Jake Crist(c) def. Rickey Shane Page - IWA Mid-South Heavyweight Championship
Alice Crowley & Becky Idol(c) def. 44.OH (Eric Ryan & Gregory Iron) - IWA Mid-South Tag Team Championship
Vincent Nothing def. Jimmy Jacobs - Singles Match

Quarterfinals
Mason Martin (w/ Erin) def. Cody McCulley - Gussets & Skewers Galore Match
Lukas Jacobs def. Logan James - Thumbtack Madness & Barbed Wire Boards Death Match
Dewey Wellington def. Lincoln Moseley - Hardcore Table, Ladders & Doors Match
Atticus Cogar def. Kevin Giza - 4 Corners of Pain & Tube Bundles Match

Semi-finals
Homerun Derby Match: Lukas Jacobs def. Dewey Wellington - Homerun Derby Match: 
Atticus Cogar def. Mason Martin - Things You Don't Wanne Be Poked With Death Match

Final
Atticus Cogar def. Lukas Jacobs - Barbed Wire Cage Match

Prince of the Death Matches 2021
Will be held July 31, 2021 at the Southside Turners in Indianapolis, Indiana.

Competitors

Quarter-finals
Jack Griffin def. Hunter Drake - Barefoot Toy Box Death Match: 
Phoenix Kidd def. Lord Crewe - Tic Tac Death Match
Dre Parker def. Jayce Karr - Light Tube Ropes And Barbed Wire Boards Death Match
The Carver def. Remington Rhor - Fans Bring the Weapons Death Match

Semi-finals
The Carver def. Phoenix Kidd - Unlucky 13 Staple Gun Death Match
Jack Griffin def. Dre Parker -Homerun Derby Death Match

Final
The Carver def. Jack Griffin - Tubes & Panes Everywhere Death Match

IWA Deep South Carnage Cup

King of the Deathmatch 2005 (Shut Down)
Happened Oct. 22, 2005 in Childersburg, Alabama, but was shut down by the police.

Competitors

Round one
Brandon Prophet def. Diehard - Light Tube Board & Barbed Wire Ladder Match
Spidar Boodrow vs. Marty Shiftbower - Barbed Wire Chairs and Pool Cues Match
Tank def. The Freakshow - Barbed Wire Boards & Chair Match
Iceberg def. Johnny 8-Ball - Barbed Wire Board & Ladder Match
Mad Man Pondo def. Insane Lane - Forks and Pizza Cutter Match

The tournament was shut down after the fifth match. In his match, Diehard suffered a severe laceration resulting a spot with light tubes.  He was rushed to the hospital where authorities were informed of the tournament's nature and then proceeded to shut it down.

King of the Deathmatch 2005 (Carnage Cup 2005)
Carnage Cup took place on December 3, 2005, at the Country Music Barn in Elkmont, Alabama.

Competitors

Quarter-finals
 Necro Butcher def. Brandon Prophet - Light Tube Table and Barbed Wire Death Match
 Insane Lane def. Freak Show - Shopping Batt Match
 Ian Rotten def. Mitch Page - Unlucky 13 Staple Gun Match
 Tank def. Hellaware Assassin - Flaming Table Death Match

Semi-finals
 Necro Butcher def. Insane Lane - Fans Bring The Weapons Match
 Tank def.Ian Rotten - Fans Bring The Weapons Match

Finals
 Tank def. Necro Butcher - Barbed Wire Ropes and Ultraviolent Light Tubes Death Match

Carnage Cup 2006
Carnage Cup Tournament took place on November 25, 2006, at the Highway 69 Sports Arena in Cullman, Alabama.

Competitors

Quarter-finals
 Insane Lane def. Ric Hayes - Razor Wire Boards Match
 Necro Butcher def. Mitch Page - Unlucky 13 Light Tubes Match
 Dysfunction def. Freak Show - Homewrecker Death Match
 Ian Rotten def. Mickie Knuckles - Bare-Foot Thumbtacks, Thumbtack Bat, Staple Gun & Barbed Wire Corner Match
 Drake Younger def. Dustin Lee - Ladders, Barbed Wire Tables, Barbed Wire Light Tube Table & Light Tube Bundles Match
 Bull Pain def. Corporal Robinson - Light Tube Ropes & Light Tube Corners Match
 Corporal Robinson & Freak Show def. Mitch Page, Mickie Knuckles, Dustin Lee & Ric Hayes - Second Chance Fans Bring The Weapons Battle Royal

Semi-finals
 Drake Younger def. Ian Rotten - 2/3 Light Tube Log Cabins Match
 Necro Butcher def. Freak Show - Taipei Death Match
 Corporal Robinson def. Tank - Four Corners of Carnage Match
 Insane Lane def. Bull Pain - Home Run Derby Death Match

Finals
 Necro Butcher def. Corporal Robinson, Drake Younger & Insane Lane - 4-Way 200 Light Tubes Elimination Match

Carnage Cup 2007
Carnage Cup Tournament took place on December 1, 2007, at the Nick Gulas Sports Arena in Pulaski, Tennessee.

Competitors

Quarter-finals
 Scotty Vortekz & SeXXXy Eddy def. UltraMantis Black - Light Tube Board, Light Tube Table, Barbed Wire Board & Barbed Wire Table Match
 Danny Havoc & Deranged def. Tank - Unlucky 13 Light Tubes Match
 Drake Younger & Viking def. WHACKS - Light Tube Corners & Light Tube Bundles Match
 Freak Show & Insane Lane def. Ian Rotten - Home Run Derby Death Match

Semi-finals
 Freak Show def. Deranged - Pits of Hell Match
 Scotty Vortekz def. Viking - Light Tube Log Cabins Match
 Danny Havoc def. Insane Lane - Razor Blade Boards Match

1.) SeXXXy Eddy got a bye because Drake Younger was unable to compete

Finals
 Freak Show def. Danny Havoc, SeXXXy Eddy & Scotty Vortekz - 4-Way 200 Light Tubes, Barbed Wire Tables Elimination Match

Carnage Cup 2008
Carnage Cup Tournament took place on October 4, 2008, outside the Red Barn Bar in Elkmont, Alabama.

Competitors

First round
 Freak Show def. Hellaware Assassin - Barbed Wire Massacre
 Prophet def. Mike Levy - Razor's Edge Death Match
 Spider Boodrow def. Syko - Devil's Playground Death Match
 Corey Shaddix def. Pinkie Sanchez - Home Run Derby Death Match
 Insane Lane def. Sam Hane - Shopping Cart Death Match
 Danny Havoc def. Juggulator - X Marks The Spot Death Match
 Nick Gage def. Devon Moore - Fans Bring The Weapons Match
 WHACKS def. Danny Demanto - Ladders & Light Tube Chairs Match

Semi-finals
 Corey Shaddix def. Insane Lane - Hostel Death Match
 Freakshow def. Spider Boodrow - Home & Garden Death Match
 Nick Gage def. Prophet - Ultraviolent Boards Death Match
 Danny Havoc def. WHACKS - Bundles of Joy Match

Finals
 Danny Havoc def. Corey Shaddix, Nick Gage & Freakshow - 4-Way 200 Light Tubes Elimination Match

Carnage Cup V
Carnage Cup 2009 took place on September 26, 2009, at the National Guard Armory in Calera, Alabama.

Competitors

First round
 SeXXXy Eddy def. Drake Younger in Barbed Wire and Carpet Strips House of Pain Death Match
 Thumbtack Jack def. Scotty Vortekz - Exorcist Death Match
 Danny Havoc def. Christian Faith - X Marks the Spot Death Match
 Nick Gage def. Insane Lane & Freakshow - Home Run Derby Death Match

Semi-finals
SeXXXy Eddy def. Danny Havoc - Barefoot Thumbtacks Match
Thumbtack Jack def. Nick Gage - Ultraviolent Boards, Thumbtack Cinder Blocks Match

Finals
SeXXXy Eddy def. Thumbtack Jack - Double Hell, Fish Hooks, Light Tube Bundles & Light Tube Table Match

Carnage Cup 6
It was held on Saturday April 10, 2010 at the Calera National Guard Armory in Calera, Alabama.

Participants

David Day
Viper
Freakshow
TJ Phillips
Insane Lane
Kody Krueger
Jason Vayne
Kornerstone

Round one
 David Day def. Viper  - Double Hell Barbed Wire Insanity Match
 Freakshow def. TJ Phillips  - Carpet Strips and Thumbtack Match
 Kody Krueger def. Jason Vayne  - Boards of Death Match
 Insane Lane def. Kornerstone  - Fans Bring the Weapons Match

Finals
 Insane Lane def. David Day, Kody Krueger, and Freakshow  - Unlimited Lighttubes Cage of Death Match

Carnage Cup 7
It was held Saturday February 26, 2011 at the Cullman National Guard Armory in Cullman, Alabama.  In non-tournament action Freakshow defeated Chrisjen Hayme to become the new IWA-DS Heavyweight Champion, and Kornerstone won a 6-man Death Match Rumble.

Participants

First round
Pinkie Sanchez def. Juicy Jimmie  - Carpet Strips Match
Danny Havoc def. Matt Tremont  - Smash, Pow, B@m! Death Match
Neil Diamond Cutter def. David Day  - Pits of Hell, Lighttubes,  and Ladders Match
Devon Moore def. Viper  - Barbwire Mayhem Match
Chris Dickinson def. Johnny Manguel  - Thumbtack Kick Pads Match
John Rare def. Spidar Boodrow  - Saw Death Match

Second round
Pinkie Sanchez def. Chris Dickenson  - Fans Bring The Weapons Match
Danny Havoc def. Devon Moore  - Lighttube Boards, Doors, and Trashcan Match
Neil Diamond Cutter def. John Rare in an Exorcist Death Match

Finals
Pinkie Sanchez def. † Matt Tremont and Neil Diamond Cutter - Ladders, Scaffold, and Lighttubes Match

†"Bulldozer" Matt Tremont replaced Danny Havoc who sustained a laceration on his back and could not compete.

Carnage Cup 8
Was held on Saturday, March 31, 2012, at 2:00 pm and Sunday, April 1, 2012, at 1:00 pm at Donna's Barn and Cafe in Elkmont, Alabama.

Participants

First round

Spider Boodrow def. Bryant Woods - Spider Net Circus Death Match
Kody Krueger def. Bill the Butcher - No Ropes Barbed Wire Carpet Strip House Of Pain Match
John Rare def. Mad Man Pondo - Deep Sea Death Match
Freakshow def. Travis Locke - Smash, Bam, Pow & Crash Death Match
Damien Payne def. Josh Crowe - Loose Light Tubes Match
Ron Mathis def. Devon Maximus - Bundles Of Joy Death Match
Neil Diamond Cutter def. American Kickboxer II - Nathans Sadistic Playground Match
Matt Tremont def. Sid Fabulous - Barbed Wire Massacre Match

Second round

Matt Tremont def. Kody Krueger - Fans Bring The Weapons Match
Spider Boodrow def. John Rare - SAW II Death Match
Freakshow def. Neil Diamond Cutter - Barefoot Pits Of Hell Match
Damien Payne def. Ron Mathis - Death From Below Match

Finals
Spidar Boodrow def. Matt Tremont, Freakshow, and Damien Payne - Four Way No Ropes Flaming Barbed Wire 250 Light Tubes Death Match

Carnage Cup 9
Was held on Saturday, November 16, 2013, at 8:00 pm and Sunday, November 17, 2013, at 1:00 pm at the SWF Arena in Tullahoma, Tennessee.

Participants

Non-Tournament (Night 2)
Big Donnie (c) def. Acid, Kornbread, and Terry Houston - DeathMatch Rumble for the $5 Wrestling Championship
Chrisjen Hayme def. Jeremy Flynt, Kayden Sade, Josh Crowe, LT Hawk vs Nick Traimer - Six Way Lucha Challenge Match
Spidar Boodrow vs John Rare was ruled a no contest when neither man could continue - SAW Death Match

First round

Sid Fabulous def. American Kickboxer 2* - House Of Glass Match
Bryant Woods def.. Jay Impact - Nail To The Head Match
Freakshow def. Yukon Jack - Fans Bring The Weapons Match
Ron Mathis def. GANGER - Carpet Strips Death Match
Matt Tremont def. Tank - Smash, Pow, Boom Match
J.D. Horror def. Spidar Boodrow - Dead Sea Circuit Net Death Match
Kristian Kross def.John Rare - Hostel Death Match
Josh Crowe def. John Wayne Murdoch due to referee stoppage - X Marks The Spot Match

John Wayne Murdoch sustained a serious cut, which led to the Match being stopped.  He required 15 stitches.
Details are sketchy, but it seems American Kickboxer 2 lost a finger.

Second round
Bryant Woods def. Sid Fabulous - Nathan's Sadistic Playground Match
J.D. Horror def. Freakshow  - Born To Be Wired Match
Matt Tremont def. GANGER [substitute for Kristian Kross] - Broken Glass, Thumbtacks & Lego Match
Ron Mathis received a bye into the finals when Josh Crowe swore off deathmatches and dropped out of the tournament.

Finals
"Bulldozer" Matt Tremont def. J.D. Horror, "Relentless" Ron Mathis, and Bryant Woods - No Ropes Barbed Wire, Bricks & Light Tubes Match

Carnage Cup 10
Was held on February 28 through March 1, 2015 at the YBW Arena in Jasper, Tennessee.

Participants

First round
John Rare def. Colt 45 - Barefoot Pin Cushion Death Match
Spyder Boodrow def. Terry Houston - No Rope Barbed Wire Massacre Match
Bryant Woods def. Insane Lane - No Rope Barbed Wire Light Tubes Lit Candles Match
Chuey Martinez def. Mosh Pit Mike and Ruben Steel - Damn Yankee Three Way Death Match
Freakshow def. El Nino Problemo - Pat's Purgatory Death Match
Corporal Robinson def. Tank - Fans Bring The Lighttubes And Thumbtacks Match
John Wayne Murdoch def. Belton Creedmore - Exorcist Death Match
Josh Crane def. Dale Patricks - Lighttubes Corners Match

Second round
John Rare def. Chuey Martinez - Nathan's Sadistic Playground Match
Bryant Woods def. Corporal Robinson - Tennessee White Trash Death Match
Spydar Boodrow def. FreakShow - Concrete Jungle Match
osh Crane def. John Wayne Murdoch - Bundles Of Joy Death Match

Finals
John Rare def. Bryant Woods and Josh Crane and Spydar Boodrow - No Rope Barbed Wire Razor Wire No Canvas Fire Cracker Board Sheet Rocks Four Way Match

Carnage Cup 11
Was held on April 29, 2017, at the Sycamore Campground and Taco Shak in Iron City, Tennessee.

 
Participants

Non-Tournament Match
Spider Boodrow vs. John Rare ended in a draw - 2 Out of 3 Falls SAW Death Match
First Fall: John Rare def. Spider Boodrow
Second Fall: John Rare vs. Spider Boodrow ended in a draw
Third Fall: Spider Boodrow def. John Rare

First round
Josh Crane def. Matt Tremont - No Rope Barbed Wire Doors Of Death Match
Dale Patricks def. G-Raver - No Rope Fishing Wire Lake of Carnage Death Match
SHLAK def. Rob Marsh - No Rope Barbed Wire Gusset Plate Hell: 
Chuey Martinez def. Blaine Evans, Brad Cash, Freakshow, Kristian Kross, Keylo Green, Terry Houston and Travis Dykes - No Rope Barbed Wire Fans Bring The Weapons and Lightubes Gauntlet Death Match
Jeff Cannonball def. Tank - No Rope Barbed Wire Gusset Plates, Taipei Death Match
Adam Bueller def. Colt 45 - No Rope Barbed Wire Barefoot Shit That Hurts Death Match
Bryant Woods def. Markus Crane - Emergency Room Death Match

Second round
Dale Patricks def. Bryant Woods, Chuey Martinez and Jimmy Lyon - 4 Way Landfill Death Match
Josh Crane def. Adam Bueller, Jeff Cannonball and SHLAK - 4 Way Arachnophobia Death Match

Finals
Josh Crane def. Dale Patricks - 500 Lighttubes Death Match

Carnage Cup 12
Was held on October 9 and 10, 2021 at the VFW Fairgrounds in Carrollton, Georgia.

 
Participants

Non-Tournament Match (Night 2)
Spidar Boodrow Memorial Gauntlet Death Match: Hoodfoot defeated Aidan Blackhart and Jamie Richards and Juicy Bruce and Lil Sicko and Mike Roach and Raider Rock

First round
JW Dalton defeated Corey Bryant - Deep South Funhouse Death Match
Remington Rhor defeated Mike Roach - Homerun Derby Death Match
Chet Rippley defeated Lil Sicko - Daredevil Death Match
Jay Blade defeated Jamie Richards - Ladders & High Impact Razorblade Boards Death Match
Hardcore Hillbilly defeated Aidan Blackhart - Shopping Cart Death Match
Chuey Martinez defeated Mizfett - Bleeding Buckets Death Match
Mosh Pit Mike defeated Hoodfoot - Hostel Death Match
Blaine Evans defeated John Rare - Spiral Death Match

Second round
Remington Rhor defeated Chet Rippley - Tokyo Towers Glass City Death Match
Blaine Evans defeated Mosh Pit Mike - Desert Death Match
Chuey Martinez defeated Hardcore Hillbilly - Fans Bring The Weapons Death Match

Jay Blade was given a bye to the finals after JW Dalton was unable to compete in the second round

Finals
Chuey Martinez defeated Blaine Evans and Jay Blade and Remington Rhor - Ultimate Carnage Elimination Death Match

See also
CZW Tournament of Death

References

External links
IWA Mid-South - Official Website
IWA Mid-South Results - Online World of Wrestling results database

King of the Deathmatch
Professional wrestling tournaments